John Bullen House is a historic home located at Dover, Kent County, Delaware. It was built between 1775 and 1781, and is a -story, five bay center hall plan, brick dwelling. The interior retains original woodwork in the central hall, the former dining room, and the second floor south bedroom. The Farmers' Bank of Delaware purchased the house in 1959.

It was added to the National Register of Historic Places in 1975.

References

Houses on the National Register of Historic Places in Delaware
Houses completed in 1781
Houses in Dover, Delaware
National Register of Historic Places in Dover, Delaware
Individually listed contributing properties to historic districts on the National Register in Delaware